Kapustin Yar is a Russian rocket launch complex in Astrakhan Oblast, about 100 km east of Volgograd. It was established by the Soviet Union on 13 May 1946. In the beginning, Kapustin Yar used technology, material, and scientific support gained from the defeat of Germany in World War II. Numerous launches of test rockets for the Russian military were carried out at the site, as well as satellite and sounding rocket launches. The towns of Znamensk and Kapustin Yar (air base) were built nearby to serve the missile test range.

Name 

The nearby village, Kapustin Yar, was used as the operations base in the early days of the testing site. The actual name can be translated as "cabbage ravine".

In public opinion, Kapustin Yar is often referred to as the "Russian Roswell"—the place where the USSR discovered, investigated, or captured alien ships (UFOs). Due to its role as a development site for new technology, Kapustin Yar is also the site of numerous Soviet-era UFO sightings. This legend has spawned various television programs, as well as Internet speculation and theories, such as speculation on the structure of an underground complex beneath the site.

History

Overview 
The 4th Missile Test Range "Kapustin Yar" was established by a decree of the Soviet government in "On Questions of Jet Propelled Weapons" on 13 May 1946. The test range was created in the desert north end of the Astrakhan region under the supervision of lieutenant general Vasily Ivanovich Voznyuk, who served as commander of the range from 1946 until 1973. The first rocket was launched from the site on 18 October 1947; it was one of eleven German A-4s that had been captured.

As of 1959, Kapustin Yar was the only publicly known Soviet missile test range. Non-Soviet observers believed at first that Sputnik 1 and Sputnik 2 launched from the site. With the further growth and development, Kapustin Yar became a cosmodrome, serving this function since 1966. The rate of space launches was very low, usually 1–2 a year, and during the Soviet era it hosted only the two smallest launch vehicles: the R-12 and R-14 derived Kosmos boosters. There were no space launches from 1988 to 1998. The town of Znamensk was established to support the scientists working on the facilities, their families, and supporting personnel. Initially, this was a secret city, not shown on maps and requiring official permission to visit.

Creation 
On 3 June 1947, by the Resolution of the Council of Ministers of the USSR and the Central Committee of the CPSU (b) No. 2642–817, Kapustin Yar was designated as the location of the new rocket test site. Voznyuk was appointed head of the training ground. The first officers arrived at the future training ground on 20 August 1947. In September 1947, a special brigade of the Reserve of the Supreme Main Command, Major General of Artillery, arrived from Germany with A. F. Tveretsky (the 22nd BON RVGK since 1950), plus two special trains with equipment taken from Germany.

By the beginning of October 1947, in addition to the concrete test stand and bunker at the first site, a launch site with a bunker, a temporary technical position, and an installation building were built. Additionally, a highway and a 20-kilometer railway line connecting the site with the main highway to Stalingrad (Volgograd) were built. Site housing was not constructed until 1948. Until then, builders and testers lived in tents, dugouts, temporary buildings, and peasant izba in the village of Kapustin Yar. Guide landfill lived in special train.

By 1 October 1947, Voznyuk reported the site was ready for launching rockets. On 14 October 1947, the first batch of V-2 rockets arrived at the test site. On 18 October 1947 at 10:47 Moscow time, the first launch of ballistic missile in the USSR was made. From 18 October to 13 November 1947, eleven V-2 rockets were launched; seven of these achieved the targeted range (two of them with a large deviation from the set trajectory) and four failed.

From 1947 to 1957, Kapustin Yar was the only place to test Soviet ballistic missiles, including the R-1 (September–October 1948, September–October 1949), R-2 (September–October 1949), R-5 Pobeda (March 1953), R-12 Dvina, and R-14 Chusovaya, among others. During 1957–1959, the intercontinental cruise missile "Burya" started at the Kapustin Yar proving ground. On 2 September 1959, the R-12 became the first missile launched from a missile silo.

In June 1951, the State R&D Test Range No 8 (GNIIP-8, "test range S") was established at Kapustin Yar.

Photo-reconnaissance flights 

Western intelligence services learned about the existence of the test site from German scientists returning to their homeland. For an additional gathering of intelligence in August 1953, a specially-trained Royal Air Force reconnaissance Canberra (Canberra PR3, tail number WH726) was equipped with a unique Robin camera. The aircraft was launched from Giebelstadt Air Base and flew over the Volga at an altitude of more than 20 km, approached Kapustin Yar. The MiGs raised in alarm could only slightly damage the aircraft. After taking a photo of the site, the Canberra crossed the Caspian Sea and landed in Tabriz, Iran. As a result of the flight, photographs of secret objects at the site were obtained. The success of the operation gave impetus to the development of satellite and aerial photography programs of military facilities in the USSR and other socialist countries.

Nuclear tests and satellite launches 
According to open data, since the 1950s, at least 11 nuclear explosions have been conducted at the Kapustin Yar test site (between altitudes of 300 m and 5.5 km), the total capacity of which is approximately 65 times the atomic bombs dropped on Hiroshima. From 1957 to 1961, five low-yield (10–40 kilotons) atmospheric nuclear tests were performed over the site. In addition to nuclear tests, 24,000 guided missiles were exploded in Kapustin Yar, 177 samples of military equipment were tested, and 619 RSD-10 Pioneer missiles were destroyed.

On 20 May 1960, the Training Center of the Rocket Forces of the Ground Forces was established on the territory of the State Landfill. The Center was tasked with creating combat coherence of missile troops, training and retraining rocket specialists, and creating regulatory documents for all-round missile combat activities troops of the Ground Forces.

On 16 March 1962, Kapustin Yar became a cosmodrome with the launch of the Kosmos 1 satellite. Subsequently, small research satellites were launched from Kapustin Yar on light Kosmos rockets.

In subsequent years, many short- and medium-range missiles, cruise missiles, complexes, and air defense missiles were tested at the test site.

Recent years 
On 8 January 1992, during a trip to Saratov Oblast, President Boris Yeltsin made a statement on the issue of the restoration of the Volga German Autonomous Soviet Socialist Republic, proposing that Soviet Germans move to Kapustin Yar instead of their legitimate territory: "...and let this land, which is filled with shells, may they cultivate it... There may be some such region in some future and there will be, or there may be some such national Volga region Germans, but only when there will be 90 percent of Germans".

In 1994, the 4 GPC Russian Ministry of Defense entered the test site Air Defense Forces. In October 1998, the 4th State Central Polygon was transformed into the 4th State Central Interspecific Polygon. In 1998, the "Sary-Shagan" test site (located in south-eastern Kazakhstan and rented by Russia) was removed from the Air Defense troops and reassigned to the 4th State Central Interspecific polygon.

In 1999, Russian troops were redeployed to the Kapustin Yar test site from the 11th State Research Test Site of the Ministry of Defense of the Russian Federation Emba (ru), due to the dismantling of the latter.

In 2008, Russia carried out 27 launches, surpassing its own figure for 2007 and setting the highest number worldwide. Most (19 / 27) launches were performed from the Baikonur cosmodrome; six from the Plesetsk space launch center in Arkhangelsk Oblast; one from the Dombarovsky Air Base in Orenburg Oblast; and one from the Kapustin Yar test site.

Missile tests and launches
 October 1947 – V-2 rocket
 18 October 1947 – Articul T (exact copy of V-2)
 10 October 1948 – R-1 (missile)
 January 1952 – S-25 Berkut
 3 January 1955 – R-11FM
 20 January 1955 – R-5 Pobeda
 2 February 1956 – R-5M with standard nuclear warhead
 22 June 1957 – R-12
 March 1959 – R-13
 6 July 1960 – R-14 Chusovaya
 11 February 1962 – R-14U
 16 March 1962 – 11K63 Cosmos
 21 September 1974 – RT-21M RSD-10 Pioneer
 12 February 1999 – S-400
 3 March 2011 – S-500
 4 March 2014 – RT-2PM Topol
 20 May 2014 – RT-2PM Topol
 28 November 2019 – RT-2PM Topol

Launch pads

In popular culture 
Kapustin Yar is mentioned in the story "Cradle in Orbit" by Arthur C. Clarke.

Kapustin Yar is mentioned in Alexander Gromov's novel Step to the left, step to the right. (M., AST, 1999.)

One of the key missions of the 2003 computer game UFO: Aftermath is the task of finding documents in an underground base located at the Kapustin Yar test site.

See also
 Baikonur Cosmodrome
 Vostochny Cosmodrome
 Plesetsk Cosmodrome
 Svobodny Cosmodrome
 Area 51
 White Sands Missile Range

Explanatory notes

References

Further reading

External links

 Web-site of Kapustin Yar
 History and map of Kapustin Yar
 1953 Spyflight by RAF
 @www.aviation.ru
 Launch Pads of Kapustin YAR
 

1946 establishments in Russia
Geography of Astrakhan Oblast
Military installations of the Soviet Union
Rocket launch sites in Russia
Soviet and Russian space program locations
Spaceports in Europe
V-2 missile launch sites
Weapons test sites